The Buttonwood Covered Bridge is a covered bridge built in either 1878 or 1898 over Blockhouse Creek in Jackson Township, Lycoming County in the U.S. state of Pennsylvania. The bridge was placed on the National Register of Historic Places in 1980, and had a major restoration in 1998. It is the shortest and most heavily used of the three covered bridges remaining in Lycoming County.

Dimensions
The following table is a comparison of published measurements of length, width and load recorded in different sources using different methods, as well as the structural type cited. The NBI measures bridge length between the "backwalls of abutments" or pavement grooves and the roadway width as "the most restrictive minimum distance between curbs or rails". The NRHP form measures length from "end post to end post", and was prepared by the Pennsylvania Historical and Museum Commission (PHMC), which surveyed county engineers, historical and covered bridge societies, and others for all the covered bridges in the commonwealth. The Evans visited every covered bridge in Pennsylvania in 2001 and measured each bridge's length (portal to portal) and  width (at the portal) for their book. The data in Zacher's book was based on a 1991 survey of all covered bridges in Pennsylvania by the PHMC and the Pennsylvania Department of Transportation, aided by local government and private agencies. The article uses primarily the NBI and NRHP data, as they are national programs.

See also
List of bridges on the National Register of Historic Places in Pennsylvania

References

External links

Covered bridges in Lycoming County, Pennsylvania
Bridges completed in 1898
Covered bridges on the National Register of Historic Places in Pennsylvania
Wooden bridges in Pennsylvania
Bridges in Lycoming County, Pennsylvania
Tourist attractions in Lycoming County, Pennsylvania
1898 establishments in Pennsylvania
National Register of Historic Places in Lycoming County, Pennsylvania
Road bridges on the National Register of Historic Places in Pennsylvania
Queen post truss bridges in the United States